The following lists events that happened during 2006 in Laos.

Incumbents
President: Khamtai Siphandon (until 8 June), Choummaly Sayasone (starting 8 June)
Vice President: Choummaly Sayasone (until 8 June), Bounnhang Vorachith (starting 8 June)
Prime Minister: Bounnhang Vorachith (until 8 June), Bouasone Bouphavanh (starting 8 June)

Events
date unknown - 2006 Lao League
18-21 March - 8th Congress of the Lao People's Revolutionary Party 
30 April - 2006 Laotian parliamentary election

References

 
Years of the 21st century in Laos
Laos
2000s in Laos
Laos